John 20:29 is the twenty-ninth verse of the twentieth chapter of the Gospel of John in the New Testament. It records Jesus' reappearance to the disciples, including Thomas, eight days after his resurrection.

Content
The original Koine Greek, according to the Textus Receptus, reads:

In the King James Version of the Bible it is translated as:
Jesus saith unto him, Thomas, because thou hast seen me, thou hast believed: blessed are they that have not seen, and yet have believed.

The modern World English Bible translates the passage as:
Jesus said to him, "Because you have seen me, you have believed. Blessed are those who have not seen, and have believed."

For a collection of other versions see BibleHub John 20:29

Analysis
One interpretation of this verse is Thomas's confession in John 20:28 has a significant weakness that it depends on sight, so Jesus needs to ' repetition of the words Thomas said a few days before (John 20:25) and the make an immediate correction by stating the 'greater blessedness of those who believe without seeing'. With this statement, Jesus was not only reaching out to Thomas, but is reaching out to all future believers (cf. ) and embraces them all. The followers of Jesus since the time of Jesus rely on 'secure evidence' (Scripture, the witness of the church through the ages, personal experiences in faith) without having actually seen Jesus.

Another interpretation is that Jesus was shaming Thomas for wanting evidence to show that the person claiming to be Jesus was in fact him, and taught that faith, which is believing without evidence, is more valuable than believing with evidence. This interpretation is supported by the fact that the use of sight in order to establish an inference is very useful in this particular situation, and was more supportive than simply hearing Jesus make his claim, since it is very unusual for someone to have risen from the dead.

This verse is often used to support the notion that the Bible teaches to value faith over evidence, and is why many Christians continue to shame Thomas for doubting, referring to him with the nickname "Doubting Thomas". In fact, this verse is often used by modern apologists to support the resurrection myth by stating that Thomas was "embarrassed" for doubting and thus wanting evidence for Jesus' claim. Their argument is that persons who were lying about the stories they were writing about would not include embarrassing details about themselves. Thus, they claim, the story is probably true because it contains such embarrassing details about the authors. If the interpretation was that Jesus was simply teaching that evidence could come from methods other than using sight, then Thomas doubting and wanting evidence would not be an embarrassing act, and that Jesus was merely using the situation as a learning experience to teach that evidence can come in other forms.

This verse is the only beatitude, besides , that is, using the formula of 'blessed' (Greek: makarios), in the Gospel of John, and, like most beatitudes (cf. Matthew 5:3-12), contains 'a note of admonition'.

Here is also 'the conclusion of the "literary partnership" shared by Mary of Magdalene and Thomas in John 20', where it traces the faith journey of both characters from misunderstanding and doubt to the acknowledgment of Jesus as the risen Lord in witnessing and confession.

References

Sources

External links
Jesus Appears to His Disciples

20:29
John 20:29